Belja is a village in Serbia, in the municipality of Aleksinac in Nisava district. According to the census in 2002 the population was 43 (a reduction from the 1991 census of 1991 when there were 56 residents).

Demographics
There are 36 adult residents and the average age is 51.7 years (52.1 for men and 51.3 for women). The village has 20 households, and the average number of occupants per household is 2.15.

This settlement is fully settled Serbs (according to the 2002 census) and in the last three censuses has recorded a decline in population.

References

Populated places in Nišava District